Bebe's Kids (also marketed as Robin Harris' Bebe's Kids) is a 1992 American adult animated comedy film produced by Hyperion Studio for Paramount Pictures. Directed by Bruce W. Smith, in his directorial debut, it is based upon comedian Robin Harris' stand-up comedy act of the same name. Harris died two years before the film was released; in the film, he is voiced by Faizon Love, in his film debut. The film co-stars Vanessa Bell Calloway, Marques Houston, Nell Carter and Tone Lōc.

Originally released theatrically on July 31, 1992 by Paramount Pictures, it received mostly negative reviews from critics for its screenplay and humor, but some praise was given for the animation and grossed $8.4 million at the box office.

Plot
The original stand-up routine by Robin Harris is shown in a brief live-action segment before an animated version of Harris woefully recounts his troubles to a blind bartender. He traces his problems all the way back to Jamika, an attractive woman he met at a funeral.

Outside the premises, Robin approaches Jamika and asks her out. Jamika picks up her mild-mannered son, Leon, from the babysitter and invites Robin to come along with her to the amusement park Fun World, to which Robin agrees. The next day, Jamika introduces Robin to LaShawn, Kahlil and Pee-Wee, a trio of neglected, truant, violent children and the offspring of her absentee hedonistic friend, Bébé, for whom Jamika serves as an obvious enabler. All six travel to Fun World, but are confronted by security at the entrance, and warned they are being watched. Upon entering the park, the kids are set loose and promptly wreak havoc. Robin's disastrous outing is further disrupted by a chance encounter with his ex-wife, Dorothea, and her best friend Vivian.

After going on a couple of rides with the kids, Robin and Jamika let them go off on their own again as they attempt to enjoy a ride through the Tunnel of Love, where Jamika commends Robin for his endurance. While Robin and Jamika spend time together on their own, Leon tries to fit in with Bébé's kids but is at first unsuccessful, although they allow him to tag along. The kids then resume their mischief until they are caught by security. However, they escape and convince a group of other free-range children to spread the chaos. Meanwhile, Dorothea and Vivian attempt to sabotage the growing relationship between Robin and Jamika but are thwarted by Robin.

Elsewhere, in an abandoned building, Leon and Bébé's kids are captured by animatronic robot versions of the Terminator, Abraham Lincoln and Richard Nixon, and are put on trial. The robot "Terminator" acts as judge who decides whether their antics are worth sending to the electric chair, while "Lincoln" acts as the kids' defense attorney with "Nixon" as the prosecutor. Leon proves his courage through a rap that not only wins their freedom but also gains him Bébé's kids' respect. They celebrate their victory by stealing a pirate ship and crashing it into a recreation of the RMS Titanic, taking hostage the crew and passengers, including Dorothea and Vivian.

Robin and Jamika finally leave Fun World, with the park ultimately crumbling in destruction through Robin's rearview mirror. When a cop passes, Robin tries to get his attention, but Bébé's kids scare the officer away. Robin drops the kids off at their apartment, where he sees how they really live. Bébé, as usual, is nowhere to be seen, and has left a note on the empty refrigerator, expecting Jamika to feed the kids. Sad to see Robin go, the kids bid him an emotional goodbye, but not before he gives them what money he has left so they can order themselves a pizza. At the bar, Robin has a change of heart and returns to hang out with the kids a little while longer, despite all the mayhem they've caused. The kids force him to take them all to Las Vegas, where everybody flees in terror when they recognize the kids. Pee-Wee finds and pulls a plug out of a socket, causing a citywide blackout.

Voice cast
 Faizon Love as Robin Harris
 Harris makes a live-action appearance in the opening scene.
 Vanessa Bell Calloway as Jamika
 Marques Houston as Kahlil
 Jonell Green as LaShawn
 Tone Lōc as Pee-Wee
 Wayne Collins Jr. as Leon
 Myra J. as Dorothea
 Nell Carter as Vivian
 Phillip Glasser as Winthrop "Opie"
 Louie Anderson as Security Guard #1
 Tom Everett as Security Guard #2
 X-Ray as Security Guard #3
 Rich Little as President Nixon
 Amy Rose Seville as Brooke
 John Witherspoon as Card Player #1
 Beatrice Miller as Card Player #2
 Bud Wiley as Card Player #3
 George Wallace as Card Player #4

Original stand-up version
In the original act, Robin's prospective girlfriend, Jamika, asks him to take her and her son to a Disneyland-type amusement park, but when he agrees she shows up with four kids, three of whom are the neglected children of her friend, Bébé, whom Jamika refuses to judge.

Bébé's kids are misbehaved truants and violent troublemakers, over whom Jamika does not attempt to exercise any control. They terrorize park staff, cut off Donald Duck's feet to use for swimming, try to steal Robin's 8-track/radio while he's listening to it, and make a general menace of themselves, literally destroying the park. Their reputation is so bad that even the police refuse to mess with them. In the second act, Robin is picked up from a bar by Jamika and the kids. The kids force him to take them to Las Vegas. Pee-Wee pulls out a power cord and the city's power goes out.

Music

Release
The original theatrical and home video release were preceded by the short Itsy Bitsy Spider.

Critical reception
The film received negative reviews from critics.

Box office
In its opening weekend, the film ranked seventh with $3,010,987, behind Death Becomes Her, Honey, I Blew Up the Kid, Mo' Money, A League of Their Own, Buffy the Vampire Slayer and Sister Act. Its final domestic total is $8,442,162.

Accolades
Bébé's Kids was nominated for an Annie Award for Best Animated Feature at the 20th Annie Awards, losing to Beauty and the Beast.

Home media
The film was released on VHS by Paramount Home Video on March 10, 1993, as well as on Laserdisc on March 17. It was then released on DVD on October 5, 2004. It was also previously included in the Warner Archive Collection. Paramount reissued the film on DVD in May 2020. On July 12, 2022, the film was released on Blu-ray for the first time.

Video game

The film was later adapted into a video game for the Super NES in 1994.

References

External links

 
 
 
 

1992 films
1992 animated films
1992 comedy films
Films directed by Bruce W. Smith
African-American animated films
African-American comedy films
Fictional depictions of Abraham Lincoln in film
Paramount Pictures films
Paramount Pictures animated films
1990s American animated films
Hyperion Pictures films
1992 directorial debut films
Adult animated comedy films
American adult animated films
American animated comedy films
1990s English-language films